The 2019 Open du Pays d'Aix was a professional tennis tournament played on clay courts. It was the sixth edition of the tournament which was part of the 2019 ATP Challenger Tour. It took place in Aix-en-Provence, France between 6 and 12 May 2019.

Singles main-draw entrants

Seeds

 1 Rankings as of 29 April 2019.

Other entrants
The following players received wildcards into the singles main draw:
  Antoine Cornut Chauvinc
  Hugo Gaston
  Lloyd Harris
  Matteo Martineau
  Thiago Monteiro

The following player received entry into the singles main draw as an alternate:
  Hugo Nys

The following players received entry from the qualifying draw:
  Dan Added
  Elias Ymer

The following players received entry as lucky losers:
  Jonathan Kanar
  Jürgen Melzer

Champions

Singles

 Pablo Cuevas def.  Quentin Halys 7–5, 3–6, 6–2.

Doubles

 Kevin Krawietz /  Jürgen Melzer def.  Frederik Nielsen /  Tim Pütz 7–6(7–5), 6–2.

References

External links
Official Website

2019 ATP Challenger Tour
2019
2019 in French tennis
May 2019 sports events in France